is a massively multiplayer online role-playing game for smartphones that is developed and published by KLab. The game is powered by Unity, and was made available for Android and iOS in April 2019 in Japan. An anime television series adaptation produced by Yokohama Animation Laboratory aired from October to December 2020.

Synopsis
The game is set in a world that has been destroyed by ten  and follows the mobile corps, a research organization by those who gained power from the "lights".

Characters

Innumael Grauer is the main character in the Magatsu Wahrheit: Zuerst anime series. Innumael is a young man involved in the transportation industry. He is a smuggler, whom his colleagues have nicknamed "The Dog". One day, Leocadio helps him load the truck faster, but accidentally loads two packages not meant for delivery. Innumael finishes loading the packages and drives the truck to its destination. He gets stopped at a customs check point where a guard checks the packages, which are revealed to house weapons. Innumael is imprisoned for smuggling, but is broken out by the smuggling organization Headkeeper. Innumael and his rescuers escape and are branded criminals.

A serious young man who belongs to the Zeroth Platoon of the Wahrheit Imperial Army. Leocadio lives with his siblings and Seitz, a childhood friend. On his first day as an imperial soldier, Leocadio sees a delivery man being scolded for slacking off and decides to help him load his truck but ends uploading goods that shouldn't have been loaded. Later, Leocadio and his squad are assigned to transport a criminal who smuggled goods, who ends up being Innumael Grauer. But as Innumael was freed from prison by the Headkeeper smuggling organization, Leocadio's commander Helman manages to locate them and engage them in a fight.

Schaake Gutheil is a main character in the Magatsu Wahrheit: Zuerst anime series. Schaake is a member of the Head keeper smuggling organization. She is a mage on the team led by Arnold. Schaake and other Headkeeper members go to take a package that was for them, but learn that the package was incorrectly loaded into a truck and transported out of the base. As Schaake tries to track it down, the group learns that a delivery driver was arrested for smuggling weapons, and realize it is their package.

Elfriede is a main character in the Magatsu Wahrheit: Zuerst anime series. She is a member of the smuggling organization Headkeeper. Her role is to infiltrate the Imperial Capital and carry out solo intelligence missions. She infiltrates the Imperial Capital and learns that money from Headkeeper is flowing into Diet. She realizes there is a traitor among them and informs Fritz, who later tells her to investigate a mental institution that was closed years ago. Believing that this may also lead her to finding the traitor, she infiltrates it and learns that Mary Bult is involved in secret human experiments, but is caught before she is able to escape. Arnold and Benjamin lead a rescue mission and manage to find her in a capsule in the mental institution.

Helman is the captain of the Zeroth Platoon of the Wahrheit Empire. He assigns Leocadio Wöhler to Seitz. They are assigned to take a criminal back to the capital, and go to take him, but learn there was a prison break and Headkeeper smugglers took the man, Innumael Grauer. Helman deduces that Headkeeper is attempting to mislead them and leads the platoon in the opposite direction, where they find Headkeeper members. Unable to run, Headkeeper engages in a fight and Helman injures Damian, but Seitz dies. He takes Damian as prisoner but does not report that he is still alive, and tortures him to learn about Headkeeper's hideout in the next city. He locks down the city, but Headkeeper manages to escape.

Arnold is a member of Headkeeper. Arnold and other Headkeeper members go to retrieve a package that was meant for them, but learn it was wrongly loaded into a truck and transported out of the base. While tracking it down, they learn that Innumael is arrested for smuggling weapons and realize it is their package. They make a plan and Arnold leads them to break into prison and save the driver and take their package. While running, Helman leads imperial soldiers, manages to find them and engages them in combat. Losing the fight, they create explosions to distract the imperial soldiers and manage to escape.

Benjamin is a member of Arnold's team. He and other Headkeeper members go to retrieve a package that was meant for them, but learn that the package was wrongly loaded into a truck and transported out of the base.

Klaus is a character in the Magatsu Wahrheit: Zuerst anime series. He is a member of Arnold's team.

Conrad Wisdom is a senior soldier of the Warheit Imperial Army in the Magatsu Wahrheit: Zuerst anime series. He is Leocadio's senior and Seitz's younger brother. He is ordered by Helman to take a prisoner back to the capital, who is freed by Headkeeper, and his platoon ends up chasing them and engage in a fight, where Seitz dies. The soldiers follow Headkeeper to the next town, but the organization manages to escape. He and Leocadio are later assigned to find and retrieve Sissel, Innumael Grauer's little sister.

Irma is a Headkeeper member of the Teito branch. In a hideout at the capital, Irma recognizes Innumael Grauer from wanted posters. After Fritz instructs them on the rescue operation, Irma and Innumael are placed on lookout. Innumael sees Leocadio and heads out. After he returns, he tells her that the imperial army knows of their actions and that it is a trap. They form an escape plan. Innumael leads the imperial soldiers away, who end up following him. After losing them in the warehouse he works at, Irma arrives to pick him up with the car and they escape.

Media

Game
The game was developed and published by KLab using the Unity game engine. It was released in Japan on April 23, 2019, on Android and iOS. Mobimon licensed the game for global release in October 2020. The Japanese version ended service on March 31, 2021, while Global version ended service on February 25, 2022, due to expired licensing rights.

Anime
An anime adaptation was announced on March 24, 2018, and aired on April 23, 2020. The series was produced by Yokohama Animation Lab and aired from October 13 to December 29, 2020, on Tokyo MX, BS11, Wowow, and MBS. The opening theme  was performed by Maon Kurosaki, while the ending theme "Disclose" was performed by Helical. In Southeast Asia, the series is licensed by Muse Communication and released on YouTube. Funimation acquired the series and streamed it on its website in North America and the British Isles.

Episode list

References

External links
  
  
 

2019 video games
Android (operating system) games
Anime television series based on video games
Funimation
IOS games
Massively multiplayer online role-playing games
Muse Communication
NBCUniversal Entertainment Japan
Tokyo MX original programming
Video games developed in Japan
Yokohama Animation Laboratory